Becky Johnston (born in South Haven, Michigan) is an American screenwriter.

Early life
Johnston attended public school in South Haven but graduated from the Interlochen Fine Arts High School in 1973.

Career
Johnston wrote the screenplays for Under the Cherry Moon, The Prince of Tides (with Pat Conroy), Seven Years in Tibet, Arthur Newman, and as yet unfilmed sequel to Salt.  She lived in the Los Altos Apartments in Los Angeles while working on Under the Cherry Moon and The Prince of Tides.

She also appeared in the Jean-Michel Basquiat documentary Jean-Michel Basquiat: The Radiant Child (2010), directed by Tamra Davis.

Awards and nominations
Johnston received Best Adapted Screenplay nominations at the Academy Awards and the WGA Awards for The Prince of Tides, having previously received a Razzie nomination for Worst Screenplay for Under the Cherry Moon.

References

External links
 
 Tricycle interview

American women screenwriters
Living people
People from South Haven, Michigan
Year of birth missing (living people)
Screenwriters from Michigan
21st-century American women